Ysleta High School is a high school in the Ysleta Independent School District in Ysleta, El Paso, Texas. It is located on 8600 Alameda and is the second oldest school in the El Paso, TX area.

Notable alumni
 Jay J. Armes, private investigator and actor known for his prosthetic hands and a line of children's action figures based on his image. Armes graduated Ysleta High School at the age of fifteen.
 Christopher Wilson (Music Producer/DJ), also known as Riot Ten. Christopher is a dubstep/house music producer and DJ. Signed under Dim Mak Records. He played running back for the Ysleta Football Team.
 Jim Price, former NFL linebacker for the New York Jets and the Denver Broncos.
 Jesse Whittenton, former NFL defensive back for the Los Angeles Rams and the Green Bay Packers.
 Julio Gallardo (1958-2011), professional basketball player with the BSN's Indios de Mayaguez in Puerto Rico and various Mexican professional teams, and of the Mexican National Basketball team.
 George Rivas, 1988 graduate. Leader of the Texas Seven and murderer who was executed by the State of Texas in 2012. Rivas and his gang were the subject of a nationwide manhunt in 2000-2001 after they escaped prison and murdered a police officer on Christmas Eve while robbing a gun store. Prior to the escape, Rivas had been serving 18 life sentences for a string of armed robberies that culminated in a three-hour hostage crisis at a Toys R Us during which he used eight employees as human shields.

References

External links
 

High schools in El Paso, Texas
Ysleta Independent School District high schools
1927 establishments in Texas